Ignacio Rodríguez Iturbe (8 March 1942 – 28 September 2022) was a Venezuelan hydrologist who was a professor at Texas A&M University.

Rodríguez Iturbe was born in Maracaibo, Zulia State in 1942. He graduated from the University of Zulia as a civil engineer and did graduate studies at Caltech, earning his PhD at Colorado State University in 1967. 

Rodríguez Iturbe taught at many universities, including the University of Zulia, MIT, Texas A&M, Princeton University and the University of Iowa. He also taught for 20 years at Simon Bolivar University.

Rodríguez Iturbe was a member of the US National Committee for the International Institute for Applied Systems Analysis from 2004. In 2008, he received a special recognition from the World Cultural Council.

Rodríguez Iturbe died on 28 September 2022, at the age of 80.

Honors
 1988 - Elected a member of the National Academy of Engineering in 1988 for innovations in the analysis, synthesis, and sampling of hydrologic signals, and for inspirational leadership in hydrologic research and education.
 1998 - Awarded the Robert E. Horton Medal
 2002 - Awarded the Stockholm Water Prize for his role in developing the science of hydrology
 2009 - Awarded the William Bowie Medal.
 2010 - Awarded the Creativity Prize of the Prince Sultan bin Abdulaziz International Prize for Water, along with Andrea Rinaldo, for developing the field of Ecohydrology.
 2010 - Elected a member of the United States National Academy of Sciences.
 2010 - Appointed by Pope Benedict XVI to the Pontifical Academy of Sciences

References

External links
Curriculum vitae at Princeton University
Ignacio Rodríguez
“Hay que prever nuevos sistemas de almacenaje, porque seguirá la sequía”. Interview for La Gaceta de los Negocios (Spanish)

1942 births
2022 deaths
Opus Dei members
American hydrologists
American people of Venezuelan descent
Members of the Pontifical Academy of Sciences
Academic staff of Simón Bolívar University (Venezuela)
Fellows of the American Academy of Arts and Sciences
Members of the United States National Academy of Engineering
Members of the United States National Academy of Sciences
Academic staff of the University of Zulia
People from Maracaibo